The Fédération internationale du béton – International Federation for Structural Concrete (fib) is a not-for-profit association committed to advancing the technical, economic, aesthetic and environmental performances of concrete structures worldwide. The organization depends on the voluntary contributions of international experts to achieve its mission and plays a role in stimulating research and promoting the use and development of concrete.

History 

The fib was created in 1998 via the merger of the CEB and the FIP.

FIP 
Fédération Internationale de la Précontrainte - International Federation for Prestressing was inaugurated in 1952 at an international meeting in Cambridge, United Kingdom.

CEB 
The Comité européen du béton - European Committee for Concrete (later: Comité euro-international du béton) was established in 1953.

In 1962 a common initiative by the FIP and CEB led to the creation of the 'Mixed CEB-FIP Committee for Drafting of Recommendations for Prestressed Concrete'.

In 1983 the Ecole polytechnique fédérale de Lausanne (EPFL) in Switzerland invited the CEB to open an office on its campus. Today this office is the headquarters of the fib.

The CEB and the FIP merged in 1998 during the last FIP Congress to form the "fib". The fib continues the work of its founding associations by providing technical reports, state-of-the-art reports, manuals, textbooks, guides, recommendations and model codes.

Working structure 

The fib’s general assembly (GA) is composed of delegates appointed by the organization’s national member groups. There are forty-one national member groups (NMGs) in the fib. They act as forums for co-operation and coordination. The general assembly deals with high-level administrative and technical matters, such as elections, finances, statutes and the approval of model codes.

The technical council (TC) oversees the work of the commissions and task groups. The commissions and task groups of the fib develop the technical bulletins that form the cornerstone of the fib’s activities.

The presidium is the organization’s executive committee and implements decisions made by the GA and the TC. It handles such matters as the scheduling of events, membership, awards and honours.

Member countries 
In 2019 the fib counts forty-five member countries. They are: Argentina, Australia, Austria, Belgium, Brazil, Canada, China, Cyprus, Czech Republic, Denmark, Finland, France, Germany, Greece, Hungary, India, Indonesia, Iran, Israel, Italy, Japan, Luxembourg, the Netherlands, New Zealand, Norway, Poland, Portugal, Romania, Russia, Slovakia, Slovenia, South Africa, South Korea, Spain, Sweden, Switzerland, Turkey, Ukraine, the United Arab Emirates, the United Kingdom and the United States of America.

Publications

Future Publication: fib Model Code for Concrete Structures 2020 
The fib aims to produce the first general structural code for new and existing concrete structures which fully integrates the provisions for the design of new concrete structures and matters relating to existing concrete structures, including situations where new structural members are incorporated as parts of existing structures. The fib project for advancing the fib Model Code for Concrete Structures will use the working title of “fib Model Code 2020”.

fib Model Code for Concrete Structures 2010 
This work, published as a hardcover and an e-book by John Wiley & Sons, presents new developments in and ideas about concrete structures and structural materials and describes the complete life cycle of structures, from conceptual design through to dismantlement. Its purpose is to serve as a basis for future codes and to present new developments in structural material, techniques and the means to achieve optimum behaviour. It is an essential document for national and international code committees, practitioners and researchers.

fib Bulletins 
The bulletins include technical reports, state-of-the-art reports, manuals, textbooks, guides, recommendations and model codes, all of which form a detailed record of the results obtained by commissions and task groups in the field of research synthesis and operational applications to concrete structures.

Journal 
Structural Concrete, the official journal of the fib, publishes peer-reviewed papers featuring the design, construction and performance of concrete structures, as well as broader issues such as environmental impact assessment.

Newsletter 
fib-news is a newsletter that is printed at the back of Structural Concrete.

Events

Symposia 
Symposia organized by the national member groups of the fib are international meetings where innovations in concrete design and construction are analysed and debated. Symposia take place three years out of four in principle. Past Symposia include Prague (1999), Orlando (2000), Berlin (2001), Athens (2003), Avign (2004), New Delhi (2004), Budapest (2005), La Plata (2005), Dubrovnik (2007), Amsterdam (2008), London (2009), Prague (2011), Stockholm (2012), Tel-Aviv (2013), Copenhagen (2015), Cape Town (2016), Maastricht (2017), Krakow (2019), Shanghai (2020), and Lisbon (2021).

PhD Symposia are biennial forums that allow PhD students to share information with the international research community. Prizes are awarded for outstanding papers and presentations. Past PhD Symposia include Budapest (1996 and 1998), Vienna (2000), Munich (2002), Delft (2004), Zurich (2006), Stuttgart (2008), Copenhagen (2010), Karlsruhe (2012), Quebec (2014), Tokyo (2016, Prague (2018), and Paris (2020-2021).

Congresses 
Held every four years, the fib Congress is the organization's flagship event, where practitioners and researchers from around the world convene to discuss and exhibit all aspects of concrete structures. Pas Congresses include Osaka (2002), Naples (2006), Washington (2010), Mumbai (2014), and Melbourne (2018).

Courses and workshops 
Generally held at least once a year, short courses, seminars and workshops are aimed at local, specialized audiences and are presented by international experts.

References

External links 
 Official website

Civil engineering organizations
International organisations based in Switzerland
Organisations based in Lausanne
Reinforced concrete
Structural steel